The Orange and Alexandria Railroad Bridge Piers are the historical remains of a bridge that carried the Orange and Alexandria Railroad across Bull Run between Fairfax and Prince William Counties, Virginia. The railroad, and this bridge location in particular, were of strategic interest to both Union and Confederate forces during the American Civil War. The bridge was rebuilt at least seven times during the war years. The piers are located just south of a modern railroad bridge.

The piers were listed on the National Register of Historic Places in 1989.

See also
List of bridges on the National Register of Historic Places in Virginia
National Register of Historic Places listings in Manassas, in Manassas Park, and in Prince William County, Virginia
National Register of Historic Places listings in Fairfax County, Virginia

References

Railway buildings and structures on the National Register of Historic Places in Virginia
Buildings and structures completed in 1861
Buildings and structures in Prince William County, Virginia
Buildings and structures in Fairfax County, Virginia
1861 establishments in Virginia
National Register of Historic Places in Fairfax County, Virginia
National Register of Historic Places in Prince William County, Virginia